Tarred and Feathered is an EP (released as 7" Vinyl Single or Download) from Swedish band The Hives, released in 2010 on the No Fun AB label. It consists of three cover songs from bands that have influenced The Hives.

As a gag of this EP album, the band members were covered in some unidentified gooey substance (as actual liquid tar is scalding hot) & feathers. The album cover was done in a style of a newspaper with the headline "Tarred and Feathered! Cheating with other people's songs!"

Track listing
 A1: "Civilization's Dying" (Zero Boys) (2:02)
 A2: "Nasty Secretary" (Joy Ryder and Avis Davis) (2:00)
 B: "Early Morning Wake Up Call" (Flash and the Pan) (4:00)

Personnel
Howlin' Pelle Almqvist - vocals
Nicholaus Arson - lead guitar
Vigilante Carlstroem – rhythm guitar
Dr. Matt Destruction – bass guitar
Chris Dangerous – drums

The Hives albums
2010 EPs